Luis Arturo Saturria (born July 21, 1976 in San Pedro de Macorís, Dominican Republic) is a former Major League Baseball outfielder for the St. Louis Cardinals (-).

Saturria was signed by the St. Louis Cardinals as a free agent on March 5, . Assigned to the High-A Prince William Cannons of the Carolina League, he was named to the Carolina League All-Star team and batted .294 with 12 home runs and 73 RBI.

He hit .274 with 20 home runs and 76 RBI and was selected to play for the World Team in the All-Star Futures Game. He also earned a September call up to the Cardinals. With the Cardinals, he went hitless in 5 at-bats. In , he played for the Long Island Ducks of the independent Atlantic League.

References

External links

1976 births
Living people
Arkansas Travelers players
Dominican Republic expatriate baseball players in the United States
Johnson City Cardinals players

Long Island Ducks players
Major League Baseball outfielders
Major League Baseball players from the Dominican Republic
Memphis Redbirds players
Minor league baseball managers
New Haven Ravens players
Peoria Chiefs players
Prince William Cannons players
St. Louis Cardinals players